In mathematics, particularly multivariable calculus, a surface integral  is a generalization of multiple integrals to integration over surfaces. It can be thought of as the double integral analogue of the line integral.  Given a surface, one may integrate a scalar field (that is, a function of position which returns a scalar as a value) over the surface, or a vector field (that is, a function which returns a vector as value). If a region R is not flat, then it is called a surface as shown in the illustration.

Surface integrals have applications in physics, particularly with the theories of classical electromagnetism.

Surface integrals of scalar fields 
Assume that f is  a scalar, vector, or tensor field defined on a surface S.
To find an explicit formula for the surface integral of f over S, we need to parameterize S by defining a system of curvilinear coordinates on S, like the latitude and longitude on a sphere. Let such a parameterization be , where  varies in some region  in the plane. Then, the surface integral is given by

The surface integral can also be expressed in the equivalent form

where  is the determinant of the first fundamental form of the surface mapping .

For example, if we want to find the surface area of the graph of some scalar function, say , we have

where . So,

which is the standard formula for the area of a surface described this way.  One can recognize the vector in the second-last line above as the normal vector to the surface.

Note that because of the presence of the cross product, the above formulas only work for surfaces embedded in three-dimensional space.

This can be seen as integrating a Riemannian volume form on the parameterized surface, where the metric tensor is given by the first fundamental form of the surface.

Surface integrals of vector fields

Consider a vector field v on a surface S, that is, for each  in S, v(r) is a vector.

The integral of v on S was defined in the previous section. Suppose now that it is desired to integrate only
the normal component of the vector field over the surface, the result being a scalar, usually called the flux passing through the surface. For example, imagine that we have a fluid flowing through S, such that v(r) determines the velocity of the fluid at r. The flux is defined as the quantity of fluid flowing through S per unit time.

This illustration implies that if the vector field is tangent to S at each point, then the flux is zero because the fluid just flows in parallel to S, and neither in nor out. This also implies that if v does not just flow along S, that is, if v has both a tangential and a normal component, then only the normal component contributes to the flux. Based on this reasoning, to find the flux, we need to take the dot product of  v with the unit surface normal n to S at each point, which will give us a scalar field, and integrate the obtained field as above. In other words, we have to integrate v with respect to the vector surface element , which is the vector normal to S at the given point, whose magnitude is 

We find the formula

The cross product on the right-hand side of this expression is a (not necessarily unital) surface normal determined by the parametrisation.

This formula defines the integral on the left (note the dot and the vector notation for the surface element).

We may also interpret this as a special case of integrating 2-forms, where we identify the vector field with a 1-form, and then integrate its Hodge dual over the surface.
This is equivalent to integrating  over the immersed surface, where  is the induced volume form on the surface, obtained
by interior multiplication of the Riemannian metric of the ambient space with the outward normal of the surface.

Surface integrals of differential 2-forms 
Let

be a differential 2-form defined on a surface S, and let

The transformation of the other forms are similar.

Then, the surface integral of f on S is given by

where

is the surface element normal to S.

Theorems involving surface integrals 
Various useful results for surface integrals can be derived using differential geometry and vector calculus, such as the divergence theorem, and its generalization, Stokes' theorem.

Dependence on parametrization 
Let us notice that we defined the surface integral by using a parametrization of the surface S. We know that a given surface might have several parametrizations. For example, if we move the locations of the North Pole and the South Pole on a sphere, the latitude and longitude change for all the points on the sphere. A natural question is then whether the definition of the surface integral depends on the chosen parametrization. For integrals of scalar fields, the answer to this question is simple; the value of the surface integral will be the same no matter what parametrization one uses.

For integrals of vector fields, things are more complicated because the surface normal is involved. It can be proven that given two parametrizations of the same surface, whose surface normals point in the same direction, one obtains the same value for the surface integral with both parametrizations. If, however, the normals for these parametrizations point in opposite directions, the value of the surface integral obtained using one parametrization is the negative of the one obtained via the other parametrization. It follows that given a surface, we do not need to stick to any unique parametrization, but, when integrating vector fields, we do need to decide in advance in which direction the normal will point and then choose any parametrization consistent with that direction.

Another issue is that sometimes surfaces do not have parametrizations which cover the whole surface. The obvious solution is then to split that surface into several pieces, calculate the surface integral on each piece, and then add them all up. This is indeed how things work, but when integrating vector fields, one needs to again be careful how to choose the normal-pointing vector for each piece of the surface, so that when the pieces are put back together, the results are consistent. For the cylinder, this means that if we decide that for the side region the normal will point out of the body, then for the top and bottom circular parts, the normal must point out of the body too.

Last, there are surfaces which do not admit a surface normal at each point with consistent results (for example, the Möbius strip).  If such a surface is split into pieces, on each piece a parametrization and corresponding surface normal is chosen, and the pieces are put back together, we will find that the normal vectors coming from different pieces cannot be reconciled. This means that at some junction between two pieces we will have normal vectors pointing in opposite directions. Such a surface is called non-orientable, and on this kind of surface, one cannot talk about integrating vector fields.

See also 
 Divergence theorem
 Stokes' theorem
 Line integral
 Volume element
 Volume integral
 Cartesian coordinate system
 Volume and surface area elements in spherical coordinate systems
 Volume and surface area elements in cylindrical coordinate systems
 Holstein–Herring method

References

External links 
 Surface Integral — from MathWorld
 Surface Integral — Theory and exercises

Multivariable calculus
Area
Surfaces